The Getaway: Black Monday is an action-adventure video game developed by London Studio for the PlayStation 2. It is a sequel to 2002's The Getaway. The Getaway: Black Monday is set in London, with new characters.

Gameplay
The game features about 140 playable vehicles, including those licensed from Rover, Brabus, PSA Peugeot Citroën and Renault.

Plot
The game begins with a flashback sequence: Sergeant Ben "Mitch" Mitchell (Bob Cryer) is chasing down an armed teenage robber. The teen robber stops running, instead of aiming his gun at Mitch. Mitch orders him to drop his weapon but the teen then chooses to try to turn around and escape. Mitch fires his weapon, which makes it seem like he purposely shot the teen in the back. One year later, Mitch is on his first day back on the team. The team heads towards an East London housing estate, where they believe the Collins Crew is storing drugs in a flat.

The team breaks into the flat but finds it empty (with only two Collins members), but PC Harvey (Seth Jee) and another SO19 officer find a door that leads to the flat next door and find tons of drugs. They soon chase them down in the apartment complex and PC Harvey is injured in the leg. Mitch single-handedly hunts down the remaining suspects, who take an old woman hostage in the roof. Back at the station, Mitch is taunted about the teenager shooting incident and almost loses his temper. Inspector Munroe (Karl Jenkinson) then informs them of a shooting at a boxing club in Shoreditch. After arriving at the scene, Mitch chases Jimmer Collins (Glenn Doherty), who manages to escape.

Munroe suspects a Latvian gang is responsible and assigns Mitch and Stoppard (Mark Beardsmore) to join a unit of SO19, who are preparing to raid a scrapyard in Lambeth to detain the suspect, Levi Stratov (Paul Kaye). Stratov is immediately bailed out and leads Mitch to Jackie Philips (Kerry Ann Smith). She informs them of a deal going down at Holborn Tube Station on Platform 4. Mitchell attempts to arrest the trader, but he escapes and is arrested afterwards. Jackie makes a phone call, saying she knows the leader, as the phone goes dead. When they arrive, a man shoots Munroe and leaves him in Jackie's apartment, which explodes, killing him. Jackie left a note saying "Skobel", while the police know a gun trade is going down. Mitch beats the trader and extracts the info, which leads the team to a warehouse.

The game shifts to Eddie O'Connor's (Dave Legeno) story. Nick and Jimmer Collins had originally planned to steal credit card codes and print their own cards. When Danny West (Denis Gilmore) owes a gambling debt to Collins, he forces West to get people to steal the credit card codes from the Skobel Group and steal the Icon (a small religious artefact, which in the end is revealed to be a case in which diamonds are hidden), so that no one realizes the card codes were stolen. Eddie, along with others, raid the Skobel Group's bank to retrieve the Icon, but everyone is killed, except Eddie, who is tortured; Sam Thompson (Jane Peachey), who escapes through a vent; and John the Cleaner (Tanner Akif), who double-crosses and runs off with the Icon. Eddie and Sam escape; they find John dead at a bar, but Eddie manages to retrieve the icon.

They return to the boxing club and see Mitch enter. Sam sneaks in and sees Danny and a young boy, presumably Errol's (Mike Harvey) son, dead, as well as Liam Spencer from the first game. Sam left a laptop at the bank and wants to return. If Eddie says "yes", they shoot their way in, but if "no", Eddie leaves her and she sneaks in. Sam retrieves the laptop. If Eddie escorts her, she doesn't get caught, but if he doesn't, she gets caught. Eddie tracks down Collins, who mentions that Viktor Skobel (Robert Jezek), the CEO of the Skobel Group, killed West. Yuri (Ronnie Yakubouski) shoots Collins' right hand three times before finishing him with a shot in the head. Eddie follows Yuri to lead to Skobel. He is ambushed by Nadya Prushnatova (Yana Yanezic), who has Jackie. Sergeant Mitch raids the warehouse (this is where his story ended off) and Eddie kills Yuri.

He then either saves Jackie Philips or lets her fall to her death. Either way, Eddie escapes and chases Viktor to his house, where he kills Nadya, and if the player chooses to, Zara (Jo Lawden). If Sam hasn't been captured, she sneaks into Alexei's (John Albasiny) car. Eddie chases Viktor to his yacht and kills Alexei. There are four different endings depending on the player's actions throughout the game. The final scene shows the outside of the pumping station. The police are standing by, and Sam and Mitch stand there if they are alive.

Reception

Black Monday received a "Platinum" sales award from the Entertainment and Leisure Software Publishers Association (ELSPA). According to Mike Rouse, a former Sony developer who worked on Black Monday, the game sold just over 2 million copies.

The Getaway: Black Monday was met with "mixed" reception upon release. In Japan, Famitsu gave it a score of two eights and two sevens for a total of 30 out of 40.

Maxim gave the game a score of four stars out of five and said: "Fun as this game is to play, the best moments come when you just sit back and observe. Wonderfully acted, written, and directed motion-capture cut scenes play like the Snatch follow-up Guy Ritchie should have made, further evidence of the narrowing gap between video game and movie production values". On the contrary, Detroit Free Press gave it a score of two stars out of four and stated that "the underworld figures are colorful, and the language [the characters] use has a life of its own. But the game's design is bollocks". The Sydney Morning Herald also gave it a similar score of two-and-a-half stars out of five and said: "The artificial intelligence of other characters is often dim. Enemies are often oblivious to your nearby presence, while colleagues provide little genuine assistance".

References

External links
 Archived website

2004 video games
Action-adventure games
London Studio games
Open-world video games
Organized crime video games
PlayStation 2 games
PlayStation 2-only games
Single-player video games
Sony Interactive Entertainment games
Video games about police officers
Video games developed in the United Kingdom
Video games set in 2004
Video games set in London
Works about the Russian Mafia